Juan Carlos Iribarren (born 27 March 1901, date of death 18 March 1969) was an Argentine footballer who played as a defender. He played in 16 matches for the Argentina national football team from 1922 to 1937. He was also part of Argentina's squad for the 1923 South American Championship. he died in 18 March 1969 in age 68

References

External links
 

1901 births
Year of death missing
Argentine footballers
Argentina international footballers
Place of birth missing
Association football defenders